The 2000–01 Russian Cup was the ninth season of the Russian football knockout tournament since the dissolution of Soviet Union.

The tournament was won by Lokomotiv Moscow who beat Anzhi Makhachkala on penalties in the final after the match finished 1–1 after extra time.

First round

The first round was played on March 29, 2000 and featured Russian Football National League teams only.

Second round

The first round was played between April 18 and May 2, 2000 and featured Russian Football National League teams only.

Third round

The first round was played between May 24 and May 9, 2000 and featured Russian Football National League teams only.

Fourth round

The first round was played between June 9 and June 26, 2000 and featured Russian Football National League teams only.

Fifth round

Matches were played on July 16, 2000.

Round of 32

Round of 16

Quarter-finals

Semi-finals

Final

References

RSSSF page

Russian Cup seasons
Russian Cup
Cup
Cup